Griffinia is a genus of Brazilian plants in the Amaryllis family, subfamily Amaryllidoideae. It includes 21 known species which are endemic to Brazil in South America. The most closely related genus to it is the monotypic Worsleya.

The members of the genus Griffinia are tropical, bulbous plants which grow in high levels of humidity. The leaves are green, petiolate, elliptical, sometimes with white speckles on them. The flowers are typical for the tribe - lilac or blue colored (although there are also white - colored species) and collected into an umbel. Many of the members in this genus are endangered because of the deforestation of their habitat.

Taxonomy 
The genus Griffinia includes  2 subgenera and 21 known species.

Subgenus Griffinia - includes the typical blue-flowering members of the genus.

Subgenus Hyline - includes white - flowering, fragrant members.
Griffinia nocturna
Griffinia gardneriana

References

Amaryllidaceae genera
Amaryllidoideae
Endemic flora of Brazil